Governor John may refer to:

A. J. John (1893–1957), Governor of Madras State from 1956 to 1957
Adrian Johns (born 1951), Governor of Gibraltar from 2009 to 2013
John St. John (1833-1916), Governor of Kansas from 1879 to 1883